The 2014–15 season was Doncaster Rovers' 136th season in their existence, 12th consecutive season in the Football League and first season in League One following relegation the previous season. Along with League One, the club also competed in the FA Cup, League Cup and JP Trophy. The season covered the period from 1 July 2014 to 30 June 2015.

Squad

Detailed overview
Caps and goals up to the start of season 2014–15.

Statistics
This includes any players featured in a match day squad in any competition.

|-
|colspan="14"|Players who left the club during the season:

|}

Goals record

Disciplinary record

Transfers

In

Loans in

Out

Loans out

Competitions

Pre–season friendlies

League One

League table

Result by round

Matches
The fixtures for the 2014–15 season were announced on 18 June 2014 at 9am.

FA Cup

In the First Round Doncaster Rovers were drawn against Weston-super-Mare of the Conference South.

League Cup

The draw for the first round was made on 17 June 2014 at 10am. Doncaster Rovers were drawn at away to League Two side York City. For the second round they were drawn away to Championship club Watford. The draw for the third round of the cup was made following the completion of second round fixtures on 27 August 2014. The Rovers were once again drawn away, this time against Championship side Fulham. They lost this match, thus exiting the cup. However they did manage to cause Fulham trouble, with James Coppinger pulling one back on the hour mark, and were unlucky not to push into extra time with a Theo Robinson penalty being saved.

League Trophy

Doncaster Rovers received a bye into round two in the Football League Trophy (known as the Johnstone's Paint Trophy for sponsorship reasons). They were drawn away to League Two's Burton Albion in the draw for round two. In the area quarter-finals Donny were drawn against fellow League One side Notts County. This match was postponed, due to County's wish to avoid a fixture pile-up.

Season summary

International appearances
Dean Furman and Luke McCullough were called up on international duty in September by South Africa and Northern Ireland respectively. Furman made two appearances for South Africa, whilst McCullough did not make an appearance. Theo Robinson was called up to the preliminary squad for Jamaica's match against Canada, but did not make the final 18-man squad. In October, Furman and McCullough were called up for their national teams again, this time alongside goalkeeper Marko Maroši for the Slovakia under 21s. In the first and second legs of the play-off Marosi did not make the final 18-man squad.

|}
 These were the matches played in by a Doncaster Rovers player
 Dean Furman

 Luke McCullough

Detailed summary

Score overview

References

2014-15
2014–15 Football League One by team